The 2011 D.C. United season was D.C. United's 17th year of existence, their 16th season in Major League Soccer, and their 16th consecutive season in the top-flight of American soccer. D.C. United tried to salvage a poor showing last season where they finished at the bottom of the MLS standings. The season covers the period of November 1, 2010, through October 31, 2011.

Ahead of the preseason, then interim-head coach Ben Olsen assumed head coaching duties, under a three-year contract for an undisclosed price. Olsen became the first head coach in franchise history to both play for and coach the squad. Upon retiring as a player on November 24, 2009, Olsen became an assistant coach under head coach Curt Onalfo. On August 7, 2010, Olsen was named interim head coach after Onalfo was fired. Olsen finished the 2010 season with a 3–8–1 record. Several major offseason acquisitions were made, in both the offense and defense. Notable signings included Charlie Davies on loan, Perry Kitchen, Dax McCarty and Josh Wolff. In the summer, a major trade was made when United traded McCarty to their Atlantic Cup rivals, New York Red Bulls, for Dwayne De Rosario. During the MLS regular season, United regularly hovered in the middle of the league's overall table, frequently swapping positions barely in or outside of a berth in the MLS Cup Playoffs. Ultimately, their playoff run ended in the 33rd week of the campaign, culminating a six-match winless streak, that included five consecutive losses.

Outside of MLS, the team failed to qualify for the third round proper of the U.S. Open Cup for the first time since 2002. In the qualification propers, United lost 3–2 to New England Revolution in the MLS qualification semifinals. Before the MLS regular season campaign, United participated in the preseason Carolina Challenge Cup tournament, where the club defended their 2010 title by recording a 2–0–1 record in the pre-season competition.

Background

The 2010 season marked the worst regular season record in United's history, as the club finished at the bottom of the Eastern Conference and overall league standings. As a result, United failed to qualify for the MLS Cup Playoffs for a league record-tying third year.

Midway through the season, head coach Curt Onalfo was fired and replaced by assistant coach, Ben Olsen. As interim head coach Olsen led the club to a 3–8–1 record, which advanced them to a season total of 22 points over 30 games.

The team concluded the regular season on October 23, 2010, with a 3–2 loss at home against Toronto FC. Club veteran, Jaime Moreno, earned his 133rd regular season goal during the final match of his professional career. Moreno departed professional soccer as the MLS career scoring leader.

Preseason

November 2010
On November 24, D.C. United acquired Dax McCarty and an allocation fee of roughly $35,000 from the Portland Timbers for Rodney Wallace and the lower of United's two fourth round 2011 MLS SuperDraft selections. Three days after playing for the entire MLS Cup 2010 McCarty was acquired by the Portland Timbers with the first overall pick of the 2010 MLS Expansion Draft. At 4:13 pm EST D.C. United announced it had signed McCarty from the Portland Timbers.

After much speculation for a new coach, United announced Ben Olsen became head coach on November 29, 2010. His three-year contract as an assistant coach was replaced with a new three-year guaranteed contract that also includes options for additional seasons. At the time of the announcement Olsen had only selected one assistant coach, Chad Ashton, who had been serving as technical director during the previous season. Mark Simpson, the goalkeeping coach, decided not to return to the club. Kris Kelderman, who had another year under his contract as an assistant coach, was named the head coach of the UW–Green Bay Phoenix men's soccer team in May 2010.

December
On December 2, D.C. United announced it would not exercise options on the contracts of defenders Barry Rice and Juan Manuel Peña, as well as midfielder Carlos Varela and Brandon Barklage.

On December 21, D.C. United announced MLS veteran goalkeeper Pat Onstad would join D.C. United as goalkeeping coach. Onstad retired after a 24-year professional career, including 136 regular season matches with the Houston Dynamo. It was also announced that Olsen would not hire a third assistant coach to replace Kris Kelderman.

On December 8, D.C. United acquired former Houston Dynamo forward Joseph Ngwenya during the first stage of the 2010 MLS Re-Entry Draft. On December 15, D.C. United acquired Josh Wolff from the Kansas City Wizards during the second stage of the draft. Ngwenya was guaranteed $156,000 for the 2011 season, which was an increase from his base salary in 2010 of $72,000. Wolff was guaranteed $160,000 for 2011, which was $60,004 less than his 2010 base salary.

Between the two stages of the MLS Re-Entry Draft, D.C. United signed D.C. United Academy player Ethan White. White previously played for the Maryland Terrapins before signing a homegrown player contract with D.C. United on December 14, 2010. He became the fourth academy signee within the last year for United.

January
The start of 2011 was highlighted by United's first selection in the SuperDraft, where they had the third overall pick in the first round. For the third pick, United drafted University of Akron standout Perry Kitchen, who was a key cog for the Akron Zips' championship-run in the College Cup the previous month. Club management expressed immense excitement in signing Kitchen, with head coach Ben Olsen and manager David Kasper sharing that if they had the first overall pick, they would have signed Kitchen.

Along with Kitchen, United signed Kitchen's teammate, Chris Korb in the second round, and in the final round, selecting Joe Willis, who last played for University of Denver in collegiate soccer, while playing for the Premier Development League's Real Colorado Foxes.

United also made one selection in the Supplemental Draft, choosing forward Blake Brettschneider in the second round. The Black-and-Red had previously traded its first-round pick and another first-round supplemental pick acquired in a SuperDraft day trade to Los Angeles Galaxy. United chose to pass on its third round Supplemental Draft selection.

On January 30, at the Washington Auto Show, United unveiled their brand-new third kits for the 2011 season. The third kit, marked the first time in club history that the team will don a third kit during any year campaign. The new third kit is predominately red; red jersey, shorts and socks, with accents of black on the jersey.

Concluding the Supplemental Draft, United shortly thereafter began their preseason training, which started with mandatory team physicals for the upcoming MLS season, as well as fitness training. Following players' medical clearances and preliminary training, United went south to Fort Lauderdale, Florida on January 31 to begin their preseason training camp.

February

During the first week of February, rumors began to circulate that D.C. United was in "serious talks" with FC Sochaux-Montbéliard to acquire U.S. national team forward Charlie Davies on loan from the French Ligue 1 side. Originally declining to comment about a possible loan, Davies' agent, Lyle Yorks, told reporters that Davies was seeking a loan, in order to have more ample playing time while recovering from a series of injuries he suffered in an automobile accident in October 2009. On February 2, D.C. United posted a press release that stated Davies would be training with United during their Fort Lauderdale training camp, for a week starting on February 3. Subsequently, club public relations released a press statement declaring that Davies would join United on loan if they saw him match fit.

On February 16, two weeks following the arrival of Charlie Davies in camp, the club made local and national headlines when they announced that they successfully acquired Davies on a 12-month loan deal from Sochaux. Club management expressed how impressive Davies was in camp. D.C. United have the option of buying out Davies from Sochaux at the end of the season should they decide to do so. United were able to obtain Davies due to their position in the leagues allocation order.

The very next day following Davies official announcement, the club waived long-time defender, Julius James. In the press statement, D.C. cited that the waiving freed another international roster spot on the team's squad. That same day, United also acquired allocation money from L.A. Galaxy when trading the international roster spot vacated with James' departure. James did not make any appearances with the club during preseason training.

During their Florida preseason training, United went undefeated in all matches, winning each match. and Florida International University's men's soccer team. Following training in Florida, United continued their preseason tour by traveling to Southern California, where they played against the PDL's Ventura County Fusion, as well as a match against UC Santa Barbara's men's team. To conclude their California preseason training, United took on fellow MLS club, C.D. Chivas USA in a friendly on February 25. During their time in California, United posted victories against Ventura County as well as UC Santa Barbara, before drawing against Chivas USA.

Concluding the Chivas USA match, the club traveled back east to Charleston, South Carolina to participate in the Carolina Challenge Cup.

March
The first half of March opened with D.C. United participating in their final preseason tune-up, the 2011 Carolina Challenge Cup, played in Charleston, South Carolina. United, the defending champions, were paired up against the host Charleston Battery in the opening match of the tournament on March 5. In the game, United emerged victorious 2–1, and moved into first place in the tournament table.

Three days later, United played their second MLS opponent of the preseason. This time, they played fellow conference foes, Chicago Fire, for the second match of the Challenge Cup. Played on March 9, the match proved to be another successful game for newly acquired Brettschneider, as he tallied on the scoresheet in the 10th minute of play. Things would continue in United's way in the 37th minute, when Chicago midfielder Diego Cháves was ejected from the game in the 37th minute, allowing United to have a one-man advantage for a significant portion of the match. Consequently, the Fire would fail to create many goalscoring opportunities, being outshot 16–5 by United. Brettschneider's tenth-minute tally was the lone goal of the match, thus giving United a 2–0–0 record in the tournament table, and placing them in a key position to win the entire cup.

Needing a draw at minimum, United were in a keen position to win their second-consecutive Challenge Cup. The club closed out their cup run with their third and final match against last-place Toronto FC; who had fallen to both Chicago and Charleston earlier in the week. The match started out heavily in favor of United, who scored off a Charlie Davies goal in the ninth minute. The 1–0 lead over the Reds was short-lived, as TFC quickly leveled off of a penalty kick scored by TFC captain, Dwayne De Rosario, leveling the match at one-all. Immediately minutes later, the Reds struck again, taking a 2–1 lead. The lead was Toronto's first in the entire tournament and, ironically, United's first time trailing in a match in the entire tournament.

Towards the end of the first half, nearing the halftime break, came an unusual string of reckless challenges from Toronto right back, Mikael Yourassowsky, on loan from Croatian side Rijeka. In the 36th minute of play, Yourassowsky was carded for a reckless challenge on Andy Najar, and a minute later was given a second yellow and subsequently ejected for doing a similarly mistimed tackle on Chris Pontius. It would not be until the 62nd minute that United were able to capitalize on the shorthanded Toronto, restoring parity at 2–2 thanks a goal from Ngwenya. The draw gave D.C. United the cup title.

Regular season
During the Major League Soccer regular season, D.C. United finished with a record of 9–12–12, failing to qualify for the MLS Cup Playoffs for a record fourth-consecutive year.

D.C. United's began the Major League Soccer regular season on March 19, 2011, when the club hosted the Columbus Crew. Though the club earned a 3–1 victory against Columbus, United would only post one more victory throughout March and April, and consequently, fell towards the bottom of both the Eastern Conference and overall standings. Additionally, the chain of losses in April culminated with the club being eliminated during the U.S. Open Cup qualification propers. However, following their 4–1 league loss at Houston Dynamo, United would go unbeaten in their next five matches, winning two games and drawing thrice.

During the summer, with United only losing three matches, and either winning or drawing their other league fixtures, the club ascended in the standings and eventually, into a position that offered a berth into the wildcard round of the playoffs. United held a spot within the league's top ten overall standings throughout July and August. By September, the luck faded as the club ran into a bit of a slump.

The slump continued into September and October, and as the club made up matches in hand, narrow losses ultimately doomed United in reaching the playoffs, as a club hit a five match losing streak. Upon their fourth-straight loss, United was ultimately eliminated from postseason contention with a 1–1 draw against Portland Timbers on October 15.

Late March

As the Challenge Cup concluded, United began to shift gears to the MLS regular season, and with that, naming their captain for the campaign. On March 16, 2011, Head Coach Ben Olsen named Dax McCarty the club captain.

United opened the MLS regular season on March 19, 2011. Their campaign opened in strong fashion, amassing a 3–1 victory over Eastern Conference foes, Columbus Crew. In the match, two of United's recent acquisitions tallied the three goals on the scoresheet; two for Charlie Davies, who came on as a 55th-minute substitute, and one for Josh Wolff. The goals for Davies were his first since August 12, 2009; when he scored for the U.S. national team in their 1–2 loss against Mexico in Estadio Azteca. The lone blemish for the Black-and-Red that evening was a converted penalty kick by long-time Crew midfielder Robbie Rogers in the 83rd minute.

Following their opening victory, the United traveled up north to take on New England Revolution on March 26. The United would fall into a 2–0 hole early in the match, with some citing poor officiating as the cause. A late penalty kick goal from Charlie Davies resulted in a 2–1 loss for the United.

April

Colorado snowstorm
April opened with United playing the defending MLS Cup champions, Colorado Rapids at their home ground, DSG Park on April 2. The match was almost postponed due to snow earlier in the day. However, the match was still called on, as a smaller crowd of around 9,000 braved the wintry conditions. The match saw Colorado take a first half lead off recently purchased Irish-international Caleb Folan. In the 67th minute of play, the United leveled the score thanks to a strike from Santino Quaranta.The tie was short-lived, as the Rapids immediately struck back with a 68th-minute goal from Scottish-international Jamie Smith. Ten minutes later, Folan gave the Rapids a 3–1 lead, and in injury time, Jamaican-international Omar Cummings gave a sucker punch goal, resulting in a 4–1 defeat for United to the Rapids.

By finishing in 16th in MLS last season, United were not guaranteed an MLS berth in the 2011 edition of the U.S. Open Cup. Therefore, they will have to qualify for one of two spots against teams that finished in 7th place or below in MLS last season.

On February 28, 2011, MLS announced that for their qualification, United would play the Philadelphia Union in a play-in game for U.S. Open Cup qualification. The decision for United to play the Union was due to the Union's proximity to United, and their relative record during the 2010 season. The match will be played April 6, 2011, at the Maryland SoccerPlex. United hosts the Union due to winning a coin flip. The winner of the D.C.-Philadelphia match will host New England Revolution in the second phase of MLS qualification. That match is expected to be played in late April 2011.

L.A. Galaxy match
In front of their largest league crowd in three years, United hosted the Los Angeles Galaxy on April 9. In their previous meeting, the United took a lead midway in the second half, before Galaxy captain, Landon Donovan scored two goals late in the game to give the Galaxy a 2–1 win. The match piqued interest across the region, as a crowd of 26,222 turned up for the game, United's largest league match crowd in over three years. The game itself ended in a 1–1 draw, with the Galaxy scoring the first goal, a Mike Magee header off of a David Beckham corner in the 12th minute. United equalized late into match, in the second minute of stoppage time, thanks to a Charlie Davies penalty kick, his fourth in MLS league play and his fifth with D.C. United.

The match itself swirled around controversy between Abiodun Okulaja's (the center referee) calls and officiating. The most questionable calls were associated the severity of cards distributed to players and a late-match decision to award a penalty kick to the United, in which many claimed was a fake trip in the box. One controversial call came from a reckless challenge by Galaxy midfielder, Beckham, to United forward, Josh Wolff in the 40th minute. Following the referee stopping play to call the foul, a verbal exchange between Beckham and United's Santino Quaranta resulted in a swarm of United and Galaxy players coming in to push the two apart. While Quaranta was not carded for his exchange with Beckham, Beckham was carded for his foul against Wolff in the 37th minute and Davies' penalty kick in the 91st. The goal received much national attention from the controversy surrounding the decision to award a penalty, and Davies' celebration for successfully converting the kick. Subsequent to the match, center referee Abiodun Okulaja ejected Galaxy midfielder Jovan Kirovski for cursing at him while sniping his decision.

Success in Toronto
On April 16, United took on Toronto FC at Toronto's BMO Field. In the 2010 campaign, United were able to pull out a 1–0 victory against the Reds; this time, D.C. was able to earn a 3–0 victory at Toronto. Their game against Toronto quickly went into good fortune for the Black-and-Red, as United found the back of the net twice within the first 10 minutes of play. The opening goal was scored by Chris Pontius, which was his first in MLS league play since his hat trick against Seattle Sounders FC last June, prior to his calf injury. Pontius netted in the 5th minute as well as the 73rd minute of the match. Additionally, Charlie Davies netted his fifth MLS goal of the year, and his second in the run of play. Davies' goal was a follow up shot in the 9th minute following a strike from winger Josh Wolff. Additionally, the game saw United not only pull out their first away win of the season, but their first shout-out since the Carolina Challenge Cup; which was also Bill Hamid's first shutout in MLS play.

Atlantic Cup drubbing
The following Thursday, April 22, United hosted their longtime rivals, Red Bull New York. Broadcast on ESPN2, it was United's first televised match on the network this year. In the 12th minute of play, a Luke Rodgers cross to Red Bulls striker, Thierry Henry led to the first goal for New York. Henry scored his third goal of the season, and the second of the match in the 38th minute of play, doubling New York's lead. Heading into halftime, Olsen replaced club captain, McCarty in for DP, Branko Bošković at halftime. Bošković, praised for his play in the match, had two shots on goal that were deflected off of the crossbar. In the 64th minute, Bošković sent a free kick hurdling towards the upper right post, only to be denied by the crossbar. Throughout a majority of the second half United dominated the Red Bulls in possession, but failed time and time again to score. A counterattack in the 72nd minute, led by Estonian international, Joel Lindpere gave New York a 3–0 advantage over United. Subsequently, Bošković had his third shot on goal deflect off the bar. American prospect, Juan Agudelo netted in injury time for the Red Bulls, giving the club a 4–0 win over United. The loss for United was their worst ever home loss against New York, and their worst loss at home since 2005, when the team lost 4–0 to Chicago Fire in an MLS Cup quarterfinal leg.

Following the club's 4–0 home defeat, United returned to Open Cup play, where they took on New England Revolution in the MLS qualification semifinals. Hosted at Maryland SoccerPlex in Boyds, the Revolution quickly got off to a 2–0 lead, thanks to a pair of goals from Revolution midfielder Kheli Dube. Dube scored in 37th and 47th minutes of play. Twenty minutes following Dube's second goal, Virginia-native Alan Koger gave the Revs a 3–0 lead. Shortly thereafter, United's Branko Bošković scored his first two goals of 2011 to trim the lead down to one goal. The late rally, however, proved to be too little, too late as the Revolution defeated United 3–2. Consequently, it was the first time since 2002 that United did not qualify into the main tournament propers of the Open Cup.

Houston defeat, U.S. Open Cup elimination
United's woes continued in their final match of April, where they traveled south to take on Houston Dynamo on April 29. United was routed 4–1 in the match, making them have a league-worst 16 goals conceded. However, with 10 goals scored, United was jointly tied for second in the league for goals scored on. The Orange Crush came out on a roaring start, as Dynamo-striker Will Bruin netted in the fourth minute of play. In the 39th minute, United defender Marc Burch scored off a complex free kick that caused the Dynamo defense to scramble, tallying his first goal of 2011. The parity was short-lived, as Bruin would regain the lead for Houston two minutes later off of a header from Brad Davis cross. Bruin would complete his hat trick in the 57th minute to give Dynamo a commanding 3–1 lead. Houston's Cam Weaver came in to add a buffer to the lead in the 62nd minute.

May

Bošković injury

During the month of May, D.C. United went undefeated in their four Major League Soccer regular season matches, winning and drawing two games apiece. While the club had success on the field, the team suffered with several injuries, including the club's lone Designated Player, Branko Bošković. Bošković, who left in the team's U.S. Open Cup qualifier loss to New England, was revealed to have a torn Anterior cruciate ligament (ACL) in his right thigh. Towards the end of the month, United hosted defending Dutch champions, Ajax in a friendly match, in which United lost.

Bošković's injury was released publicly on May 1, only three days before their midweek fixture against Seattle Sounders FC. D.C. United, who had never defeated Seattle at home, was coming off a two-match winning streak. The match ended in United's favor, as goals from Josh Wolff and Charlie Davies helped United earn a 2–1 victory. Playing their third match within a week, United hosted 2010 MLS Cup-finalists, FC Dallas on May 7. Like United, Dallas was suffering from a slew of injuries, most notably forward David Ferreira who broke his ankle in Dallas' 2–1 away victory at Vancouver. The game itself ended in a scoreless tie, though United out shot Dallas 5–2 in total shots on frame.

Rapids draw, Ajax friendly loss
Within a week, United squared off in their return match against the defending league champions, Colorado Rapids. The May 14 affair ended in a 1–1 draw between the two camps as the Rapids' Drew Moor netted a 23rd-minute brace to give the visitors an advantage. The hosts, United, continued to press throughout the match, dominating possession. In the 56th minute, what seemed to be a certain foul in the box for a penalty from Colorado's Jeff Lorentowictz on D.C.'s Joseph Ngwenya was waved off, resulting in heavy dissent from both the players and the bench of United. The incident was seemingly hindered in the 62nd minute when the Rapids' Kosuke Kimura collided with United's Chris Pontius. Pontius would subsequently score from the penalty spot, leveling the scoreline and thus giving United a draw.

During the week of May 22, United had a bye week from league play, which allowed the club to schedule a home friendly against the defending Dutch champions, AFC Ajax of Amsterdam. The previous week, Ajax had tallied a 3–1 win over Twente to secure the Dutch title for an unprecedented 30th time, their first since 2004. The Amsterdamers notched an early strike in the 10th minute thanks to forward, and Serbian international, Miralem Sulejmani. The Black-and-Red managed to make up for the early setback thanks to a 58th-minute cross from Ngwenya to newly drafted Blake Brettschneider, leveling the match at one apiece. However, the match ended in Ajax's favor over United as the Amsterdammers tallied a final goal in the 87th minute courtesy of midfielder Vurnon Anita.

Victory at Jeld-Wen

Heading into Memorial Day Weekend, United wrapped up May with the opening match of their two-game West Coast road trip on May 29 at Jeld-Wen Field to take on the Portland Timbers. The Timbers, who held a 5–3–2 record prior to the match had won every single match at home during MLS play. United successfully ended that home streak with a 3–2 victory over the Timbers, thanks to goals from Perry Kitchen, his first professional goal in his career, as well as Chris Pontius and Josh Wolff. In the match, Kitchen opened the scoring for United with a 13th-minute half-volley thanks to a redirected header from Dejan Jakovic. While United were able to hold the 1–0 lead well into the second half of play, a chain of contentious decisions from center official Geoff Gamble, but primarily linesmen Eric Proctor. It was only the second MLS match that Gamble officiated, with his first coming on the previous weekend. In the 67th minute of play, United conceded a penalty kick to the Timbers. United goalkeeper, Bill Hamid initially saved Timbers striker Kenny Cooper's first penalty shot, only for the shot to be retaken. Proctor flagged for a retaking of the kick claiming that Hamid stepping off his line before the kick was taken, an infraction of the rules. The contrasting argument from Hamid, as well as other United players, was that Cooper stutter-stepped before taking the ball, which is illegal in the Laws of the Game. Nevertheless, it was ruled that a second retake would be taken, again by Cooper. Hamid consecutively saved the shot, only for Proctor to again rule that Hamid repeated the same original infraction. The ruling caused Hamid to storm over to Proctor in disdain for his decision, consequently earning Hamid a yellow card for dissent. For the third shot on the mark, Timbers captain Jack Jewsbury took the shot and buried it in the bottom left-hand post, leveling the score at 1–1. The stalemate was tentative, as Diego Chara of the Timbers conceded a penalty in the box when he mistimed a slide tackle on Pontius, leading to a handball. Pontius scored his second penalty of the season, and his second consecutive in league play to give United the 2–1 advantage. A quarter of an hour later, Wolff notched a goal, extending United's lead in the 85th minute. The Timbers' Jorge Perlaza scored a consolation goal in the 88th minute of play, but it would fail to be enough.

June

Third kit debut, L.A. "family affair"

The beginning of June was heralded by the debut of United's third kit, which debuted in the opening match of the month. The new third kit, which featured a primary color of red, with black accents debuted in the June 3 away fixture at Los Angeles Galaxy. June also saw a wave of controversy arrive involving Charlie Davies and deceiving match officials during the run of play, causing Davies to be fined by MLS. As the international transfer window neared, United made an unanticipated, blockbuster trade with their Atlantic Cup rivals, New York Red Bulls on June 27. On the pitch, however, United failed to win any matches during the month, tallying three draws and a loss during the month.

The opening match of June was deemed a "family affair" by the media, due to the close relationship between Galaxy manager, Bruce Arena and United manager, Ben Olsen. Beforehand, Arena coached Olsen on the dynasty D.C. United squad of the late 1990s and on the United States national team into the mid 2000s. Continuing their unbeaten streak from May, United earned a 1–1 draw. With the draw, United tentatively moved into third place in the Eastern Conference, ahead of Columbus Crew.

In spite of the strong finish at Los Angeles, who led the Western Conference and overall standings at the time, United failed to win any matches during the month of June, amassing three subsequent draws and a loss. The loss would come the following week on June 11, where they would lose at home against San Jose Earthquakes. Consequently, the loss, along with a Columbus victory, saw United fall to fourth in the conference and 11th in the overall standings.

Davies controversy in Salt Lake

On June 16, United embarked for Salt Lake City for an June 18 away game at Real Salt Lake. Played at Rio Tinto Stadium, the venue has been considered by fans and media alike to be one of the most hostile environments in MLS and in North American to play in. In franchise history, United had not only failed to win in Rio Tinto, but failed to earn a point in the stadium. In spite of Salt Lake's struggling form, and United's improved form, many still expected Real to defeat United, having the home field advantage and a stronger roster. The June 18 fixture played to a 1–1 tie thanks to penalty kicks from Salt Lake's Fabian Espindola and United's Charlie Davies. The match was marred for its extremely physical, sometimes ruthless play, as well as the lack of discipline imposed by center referee, Terry Vaughn, who only gave one yellow card the entire match. Espindola scored the opening goal in the 38th minute. The penalty was drawn when Salt Lake captain, Kyle Beckerman dribbled within the goal box. As Beckerman dribbled inwards, United's Clyde Simms mistime a slide tackle that missed Beckerman, but resulted in his right wrist deflecting Beckerman's pass into the box. In the second half, United continued to control a majority of the ball position, only to see Chris Pontius's shot deflect off the crossbar in the 53rd minute. Controversy further ignited on what many fans and journalists declared a dive from United's Davies, who drew a penalty kick in the 85th minute, following a breakaway counterattack. The declaration was near universal as video replay and still frames of the incident in the penalty box revealed Davies falling in a diving motion prior to Salt Lake defender, Chris Wingert making any contact with Davies, only to do so once Davies had already fallen down. In spite of this, center official Terry Vaughn whistled it to be a penalty kick. Met with heavy jeers at Rio Tinto, Davies successfully bagged the match tying goal, in spite of the fact that Salt Lake's goalkeeper, a former United player, Nick Rimando, guessed the correct way. In the 92nd minute, during stoppage time, Salt Lake's Jamison Olave recklessly fouled United's Blake Brettschneider to draw a final set piece, possibly to allow United to earn a shocking road win in Salt Lake. However, Najar's free kick was successfully passed to Pontius, whose shot deflected off the crossbar, allowing the match to remain leveled at one apiece. At the match's end heavy boos were ignited by the Salt Lake crowd, primarily directed towards the officiating. The match was deemed as one of the most reckless matches of 2011.

Celebrity golf tournament, McCarty–De Rosario trade
On June 20, United hosted its annual celebrity tournament. That same day, the club made more headlines when they announced that Fred would be allowed to join Australian A-League side, Melbourne Heart on a summer transfer in July. The exact date was not disclosed, although mid-season transfer window in MLS opens on July 15 and closes August 31.

One week later, United made national headlines following an unexpected trade with their Atlantic Cup rivals, Red Bull New York. The trade, announced on June 27, involved United acquiring New York midfielder, Dwayne De Rosario in exchange for United central midfielder, Dax McCarty.

July

The month of July began with D.C. United announcing a new assistant coach, as well as playing two nearby Eastern Conference rivals. On July 1, the franchise announced that Dutch manager Sonny Silooy was hired as an assistant coach for the senior team. Three days later, United played budding rivals, Philadelphia Union at home. The match, ending in a 2–2 tie saw newcomer Dwayne De Rosario make an assist to Josh Wolff as well as midfielder Andy Najar score a long range volley from 35 yards.

Victory in New York, Atlantic Cup defeat
The following week, United traveled up the Interstate 95 corridor to take on their Atlantic Cup rivals, Red Bull New York. The Red Bulls, previously thrashed United 4–0 in April, and looked to be heavy favorites by fans and the media alike, especially coming off a 5–0 home win over Toronto. During the 61st minute of play, De Rosario scored against his former club to give United a 1–0 advantage, which ended up being the match-winning goal. The win means that the Red Bulls have failed to defeat United at home since 2008. In spite of the win, United failed to win the Atlantic Cup trophy for the second consecutive year, losing 4–1 on aggregate. However, despite winning the Cup for the second straight year, Red Bulls players found the consolation prize as nothing worth meriting about. D.C. continued their streak the following week, drawing 0–0 to FC Dallas at Pizza Hut Park.

United concluded July with a 2–0 victory over the San Jose Earthquakes at Buck Shaw Stadium. De Rosario scored both goals.

August
The fifth month into D.C. United's regular season campaign marked the return of several players whom were previously injured throughout the season. Some key players included Dejan Jakovic, Kurt Morsink and Santino Quaranta. On the field, D.C. United was scheduled to host Canada's two MLS franchises, Toronto FC and Vancouver Whitecaps FC, respectively. While recent United acquisition, and former Toronto captain, Dwayne De Rosario scored a hat trick against his former club, a shorthanded United ended up drawing 3–3 against Toronto. The following weekend, United posted a 4–0 thrashing of last-place Vancouver, earning their largest home victory since 2008.

Upon their homestance against the Canadian teams, United hit the road for matches at Eastern Conference rivals, Chicago Fire and Sporting Kansas City. A lone goal in the 73rd minute from United's Josh Wolff gave the team a point against Chicago, while an early goal from Sporting's Omar Bravo consequently ended in a 1–0 defeat against Kansas City, making it the first time since April 27 that United lost on the road.

Originally, United was expecting to conclude their competitive play on August 27, at home to the Portland Timbers, but due to the effects of Hurricane Irene, the match was rescheduled from 7:30 pm to 2:30 pm. Two days prior to the match itself, the club and the MLS League Committee agreed to postpone the match to a later date. It was later confirmed that the match would be played in October.

September
With the Portland match being postponed, it resulted in a three-week span of no competitive play for D.C. United. To give his players some additional rest and to ease the tensions in training sessions, head coach Ben Olsen granted the players and staff a four-week break over Labor Day Weekend. On September 6, United players and staff rejoined one another in training, four days ahead of their trip to Los Angeles for their road fixture against Chivas USA. The September 10 match led to a 3–0 victory for United, earning their largest road victory since April. Charlie Davies netted a hat trick, scoring thrice in the run of play, each goal coming off of an assist from Chris Pontius. However, the large victory paid a devastating price, as Pontius collided with ??? in the 83rd minute, breaking his leg, and consequently missing the remainder of the season. The road swing concluded with a 3–0 loss to Seattle Sounders.

Following the defeat to Seattle, United had a two-match homestand against 2005 expansion teams, Chivas USA and Real Salt Lake. Against Chivas USA, United went up 2–0 before conceding twice to settle for a 2–2 draw. Against Real Salt Lake, Dwayne De Rosario netted a hat trick in the match within the first 31 minutes, scoring the fastest hat trick in MLS history, earning him Player of the Week honors. In addition to De Rosario's three goals, he assisted to Andy Najar, and the club won 4–1 over Salt Lake.

The month of competitive matches ended on September 29 with a trip to their budding I-95 rivals, Philadelphia Union, where United lost 3–2.

October

Entering the final month of the regular season, the race for the 2011 MLS Cup Playoffs began to heat up. In their away fixture at Columbus Crew, United lost 1–2, with United's Daniel Woolard scoring the lone goal for the club. It was the first time since April 29 that the team lost consecutive matches. Consequently, the club remained outside of the playoff race. United in need of points, lost their third-straight match on the road to Vancouver Whitecaps, 2–1.

On October 15, United lost their fourth-consecutive match, making it their longest losing streak since August 2010. Playing Chicago, United took a 1–0 lead in the 90th minute thanks to a penalty kick from De Rosario. The slight goal lead seemed certain to return United back into a playoff position for only Chicago's Sebastián Grazzini and Diego Cháves to score for the Fire in the third and fifth minutes of stoppage time, respectively. Despite the loss, United barely remained in the playoff chance. On October 19, United hosted the Portland Timbers. With the match ending in a 1–1 draw, United failed to qualify for the playoffs for a team-record fourth-consecutive season. United concluded the regular season on October 22 with a 0–1 home loss to Sporting Kansas City.

Competitions
Key

Preseason

Carolina Challenge Cup

Major League Soccer

Matches

MLS Reserve League

U.S. Open Cup

Mid-season exhibitions

Club information

Roster
As of August 3, 2011.

Coaching staff

International players
The following players on the club have received international call-ups during the season or within the previous year:

{| class="wikitable" style="font-size:95%"
|-
!style="background:#c2ddff;width:150px"|Nation
!style="background:#c2ddff;width:125px"|Player
!style="background:#c2ddff;width:50px"|Position
!style="background:#c2ddff;width:215px"|Last call-up
|-
|rowspan="2"|||Dwayne De Rosario||MF||v. ; June 14, 2011
|-
|Dejan Jakovic||DF||v. ; June 1, 2011
|-
|||Branko Bošković||MF||v. ; October 12, 2010
|-
|||Andy Najar||MF||v. ; September 3, 2011
|-
|rowspan="3"|||Bill Hamid||GK||v. ; September 2, 2011
|-
|Chris Pontius||FW||v. ; September 2, 2011
|-
|Josh Wolff||FW||v. ; January 22, 2011
|-
|||Perry Kitchen||DF||v.

Standings

Results summary

Results by round

Statistics

Competitions table

MLS regular season

Field players
{| class="wikitable sortable"
|-
!
!
!Player
!
!
!
!
!
!
!
!
!
!
!
!
|- align=center
|||2||align=left|McDonaldBrandon McDonald
|DF||13||13||1139||0||0||4||0||15||7||2||0
|- align=center
|||3||align=left|BrasescoRodrigo Brasesco
|DF||3||2||155||0||0||0||0||0||0||1||0
|- align=center
|||3||align=left|Da LuzAustin da Luz
|DF||8||2||311||0||0||7||2||3||0||2||0
|- align=center
|||4||align=left|BurchMarc Burch
|DF||12||8||787||1||1||2||1||6||6||2||0
|- align=center
|||5||align=left|JakovicDejan Jakovic
|DF||15||15||1324||0||0||2||1||18||9||3||1
|- align=center
|||6||align=left|MorsinkKurt Morsink
|MF||2||2||157||0||0||0||0||0||0||1||0
|- align=center
|||7||align=left|De RosarioDwayne De Rosario
|MF||13||12||1166||10||6||55||26||25||20||1||0
|- align=center
|||8||align=left|BoskovicBranko Bošković
|MF||4||1||124||0||0||8||2||1||0||0||0
|- align=center
|||9||align=left|DaviesCharlie Davies
|FW||22||16||1388||11||3||31||17||22||21||3||0
|- align=center
|||10||align=left|McCartyDax McCarty
|MF||13||11||946||0||2||10||2||12||13||1||0
|- align=center
|||11||align=left|NgwenyaJoseph Ngwenya
|FW||14||6||572||0||0||11||6||19||8||1||0
|- align=center
|||12||align=left|ZaynerJed Zayner
|DF||4||4||311||0||1||0||0||0||0||0||0
|- align=center
|||13||align=left|PontiusChris Pontius
|FW||25||25||2144||7||5||53||20||18||33||2||0
|- align=center
|||14||align=left|NajarAndy Najar
|MF||25||22||1982||4||6||40||16||33||32||1||1
|- align=center
|||15||align=left|WhiteEthan White
|DF||21||18||1659||1||0||5||4||14||1||3||0
|- align=center
|||16||align=left|WolffJosh Wolff
|FW||24||19||1545||5||6||16||17||24||28||1||0
|- align=center
|||19||align=left|SimmsClyde Simms
|MF||25||25||2132||0||0||8||1||17||5||1||0
|- align=center
|||20||align=left|KingStephen King
|MF||15||7||717||1||0||9||3||6||8||0||0
|- align=center
|||21||align=left|WoolardDaniel Woolard
|DF||21||21||1868||0||0||5||0||14||17||0||0
|- align=center
|||22||align=left|KorbChris Korb
|DF||7||7||570||0||2||0||0||0||0||0||0
|- align=center
|||23||align=left|KitchenPerry Kitchen
|DF||25||24||2186||1||0||7||2||24||21||1||0
|- align=center
|||24||align=left|BarklageBrandon Barklage
|DF||4||0||38||0||0||2||1||1||0||0||0
|- align=center
|||25||align=left|QuarantaSantino Quaranta
|MF||15||7||752||1||0||11||3||18||9||2||1
|- align=center
|||27||align=left|FredFred
|MF||17||5||596||0||1||10||1||14||10||3||0
|- align=center
|||29||align=left|BrettschneiderBlake Brettschneider
|FW||12||8||644||1||2||15||4||12||7||1||0

Goalkeepers
{| class="wikitable sortable"
|-
!
!
!Player
!
!
!
!
!
!
!
!
!
!
!
!
!
!
|- align=center
|||1||align=left|CroninSteve Cronin
||2||0||126||0||4||10||6||0.6||2.86||0||0||0||0||2
|- align=center
|||20||align=left|OnstadPat Onstad
||3||3||270||0||7||16||8||0.5||2.33||2||2||1||2||0
|- align=center
|||28||align=left|HamidBill Hamid
||22||22||1852||7||26||83||56||0.675||1.26||4||4||7||4||9
|- align=center
|||31||align=left|WillisJoe Willis
||3||3||270||1||4||16||12||0.75||1.33||0||0||1||2||0

U.S. Open Cup

Field players
{| class="wikitable sortable"
|-
!
!
!Player
!
!
!
!
!
!
!
!
!
!
!
!
|- align=center
|||2||align=left|McDonaldBrandon McDonald
|DF||0||0||0||0||0||0||0||0||0||0||0
|- align=center
|||3||align=left|BrasescoRodrigo Brasesco
|DF||1||1||41||0||0||0||0||0||0||0||0
|- align=center
|||3||align=left|Da LuzAustin da Luz
|DF||0||0||0||0||0||0||0||0||0||0||0
|- align=center
|||4||align=left|BurchMarc Burch
|DF||0||0||0||0||0||0||0||0||0||0||0
|- align=center
|||5||align=left|JakovicDejan Jakovic
|DF||1||0||79||0||0||0||0||0||0||0||0
|- align=center
|||6||align=left|MorsinkKurt Morsink
|MF||0||0||0||0||0||0||0||0||0||0||0
|- align=center
|||7||align=left|De RosarioDwayne De Rosario
|MF||0||0||0||0||0||0||0||0||0||0||0
|- align=center
|||8||align=left|BoskovicBranko Bošković
|MF||1||1||120||2||0||0||0||0||0||0||0
|- align=center
|||9||align=left|DaviesCharlie Davies
|FW||0||0||0||0||0||0||0||0||0||0||0
|- align=center
|||10||align=left|McCartyDax McCarty
|MF||0||0||0||0||0||0||0||0||0||0||0
|- align=center
|||11||align=left|NgwenyaJoseph Ngwenya
|FW||1||1||120||0||1||0||0||0||0||0||0
|- align=center
|||12||align=left|ZaynerJed Zayner
|DF||0||0||0||0||0||0||0||0||0||0||0
|- align=center
|||13||align=left|PontiusChris Pontius
|FW||1||0||31||0||0||0||0||0||0||0||0
|- align=center
|||14||align=left|NajarAndy Najar
|MF||1||1||120||0||0||0||0||0||0||0||0
|- align=center
|||15||align=left|WhiteEthan White
|DF||1||1||120||0||0||0||0||0||0||0||0
|- align=center
|||16||align=left|WolffJosh Wolff
|FW||1||1||120||1||0||0||0||0||0||0||0
|- align=center
|||19||align=left|SimmsClyde Simms
|MF||0||0||0||0||0||0||0||0||0||0||0
|- align=center
|||20||align=left|KingStephen King
|MF||1||1||120||0||0||0||0||0||0||0||0
|- align=center
|||21||align=left|WoolardDaniel Woolard
|DF||1||1||120||0||0||0||0||0||0||0||0
|- align=center
|||22||align=left|KorbChris Korb
|DF||0||0||0||0||0||0||0||0||0||0||0
|- align=center
|||23||align=left|KitchenPerry Kitchen
|DF||0||0||0||0||0||0||0||0||0||0||0
|- align=center
|||24||align=left|BarklageBrandon Barklage
|DF||1||1||0||0||0||0||0||0||0||0||0
|- align=center
|||25||align=left|QuarantaSantino Quaranta
|MF||0||0||0||0||0||0||0||0||0||0||0
|- align=center
|||27||align=left|FredFred
|MF||1||1||89||0||0||0||0||0||0||0||0
|- align=center
|||29||align=left|BrettschneiderBlake Brettschneider
|FW||0||0||0||0||0||0||0||0||0||0||0

Goalkeepers
{| class="wikitable sortable"
|-
!
!
!Player
!
!
!
!
!
!
!
!
!
!
!
!
!
!
|- align=center
|||1||align=left|CroninSteve Cronin
||2||0||126||0||4||10||6||0.6||2.86||0||0||0||0||2
|- align=center
|||20||align=left|OnstadPat Onstad
||3||3||270||0||7||16||8||0.5||2.33||2||2||1||2||0
|- align=center
|||28||align=left|HamidBill Hamid
||22||22||1852||7||26||83||56||0.675||1.26||4||4||7||4||9
|- align=center
|||31||align=left|WillisJoe Willis
||3||3||270||1||4||16||12||0.75||1.33||0||0||1||2||0

Recognition

MLS Honors

MLS Player of the Month

MLS Player of the Week

MLS Best XI of the Week

MLS All-Stars 2011

Footnotes
A : Player left the club in the middle of the season
B : Player was injured during the campaign

Transfers

In

Out

Loan in

Loan out

Miscellany

Allocation ranking
D.C. United is in the No. 15 position in the MLS Allocation Ranking. The allocation ranking is the mechanism used to determine which MLS club has first priority to acquire a U.S. National Team player who signs with MLS after playing abroad, or a former MLS player who returns to the league after having gone to a club abroad for a transfer fee. D.C. United started 2011 ranked No. 3 on the allocation list and used its ranking to acquire Charlie Davies. A ranking can be traded, provided that part of the compensation received in return is another club's ranking.

International roster spots
D.C. United has five international roster spots, the fewest of any MLS club. Each club in Major League Soccer is allocated eight international roster spots, which can be traded. D.C. United traded one spot to Kansas City on February 3, 2010, for use during the 2010 and 2011 seasons, traded another spot to Los Angeles Galaxy on February 17, 2011, for use during the 2011 and 2012 seasons, and traded another spot to New York Red Bulls on July 16, 2011, for use during the remainder of the 2011 season. The remaining roster slots must belong to domestic players. For clubs based in the United States, a domestic player is either a U.S. citizen, a permanent resident (green card holder) or the holder of other special status (e.g., refugee or asylum status).

As of February 12, United have 21 American players on their roster. This is the most of any MLS club.

Future draft pick trades

References
Footnotes
A : College soccer team.
B : Waived due lack of international roster spots
C : Brandon Barklage's contract originally expired at the end of the 2010 season, and the club did not renew the contract. He re-signed with the club the following spring after a trial.
Citations

2011
D.C. United
D.C. United
2011 in sports in Washington, D.C.